Xandro Meurisse (born 31 January 1992) is a Belgian cyclist, who currently rides for UCI ProTeam . In July 2019, he was named in the startlist for the 2019 Tour de France.

Major results

2010
 5th Ronde van Vlaanderen Juniors
2013
 8th Overall Okolo Jižních Čech
1st Stage 4
2014
 1st Stage 3 Triptyque Ardennais
 3rd Dwars door de Vlaamse Ardennen
 4th Memorial Van Coningsloo
 7th Omloop Het Nieuwsblad U23
 8th Internationale Wielertrofee Jong Maar Moedig
 9th Circuit de Wallonie
2015
 1st  Mountains classification Circuit des Ardennes
 8th Overall Boucles de la Mayenne
 10th Overall Tour of Britain
2016
 3rd Overall Four Days of Dunkirk
1st Stage 4
 5th Overall Driedaagse van West-Vlaanderen
 5th Schaal Sels
 7th Overall Tour of Britain
1st  Mountains classification
 7th Overall Circuit des Ardennes
 7th Overall Tour de Wallonie
2017
 2nd Overall Tour de Luxembourg
1st  Young rider classification
 2nd Volta Limburg Classic
 2nd Dwars door de Vlaamse Ardennen
 3rd Druivenkoers Overijse
 6th Overall Circuit de la Sarthe
 6th Famenne Ardenne Classic
 7th Overall Tour de Wallonie
2018
 1st Druivenkoers Overijse
 2nd Overall Circuit de la Sarthe
 4th Memorial Marco Pantani
 5th Boucles de l'Aulne
 6th Road race, UEC European Road Championships
 6th Overall Four Days of Dunkirk
 10th Grand Prix Pino Cerami
2019
 5th Boucles de l'Aulne
2020
 1st  Overall Vuelta a Murcia
1st  Points classification
1st Stage 1
 10th Antwerp Port Epic
2021
 1st Giro del Veneto
2022
 3rd Overall Circuit de la Sarthe
 3rd GP Industria & Artigianato
 10th Brabantse Pijl

Grand Tour general classification results timeline

References

External links

1992 births
Living people
Belgian male cyclists
Sportspeople from Kortrijk
Cyclists from West Flanders
21st-century Belgian people